Robert Freeman may refer to:

Politicians
Robert Freeman (MP for Bletchingley), Member of Parliament (MP) for Bletchingley
Robert Freeman (MP for Southwark), MP for Southwark
Robert Louis Freeman Sr. (1934–2016), Democratic lieutenant governor of the U.S. state of Louisiana, 1980–1988
Robert L. Freeman (born 1956), Democratic member of the Pennsylvania House of Representatives
Robert D. Freeman (1921–2001), former member of the Ohio Senate
 Bob Freeman (politician), member of the Tennessee House of Representatives

Religion
Robert Freeman (pastor) (1878–?), Scottish-American clergyman
Robert C. Freeman, professor of Church History and Doctrine at Brigham Young University
Robert Freeman (bishop) (born 1952), Church of England bishop of Penrith

Music
Bobby Freeman (1940–2017), African-American soul singer, songwriter, and record producer
Robert Freeman (musician) (born 1935), American pianist, music educator, and musicologist
Rob Freeman (born 1981), former guitarist, backing vocalist and songwriter for Hidden in Plain View

Others
Robert Tanner Freeman (1846–1873), first African-American to graduate from the Harvard School of Dental Medicine
Bobby Freeman (American football) (1932–2003), American football defensive back 
Robert Freeman (photographer) (1936–2019), photographer and designer
Robert Freeman (born 1953), American financial industry arbitrageur, see Dennis Levine
Robert Freeman, one of the main characters from The Boondocks franchise
Robert M. Freeman, Goldman Sachs partner convicted of insider trading in 1989
Bobby Freeman (writer), writer, journalist, television presenter and cook
Robert T. Freeman, contemporary artist and member of the Boston Arts Commission

See also
Freeman (surname)
Robert Freeman Hopwood (1856–1940), Republican member of the U.S. House of Representatives from Pennsylvania
Robert Freeman Smith (born 1931), member of the U.S. House of Representatives from Oregon
Robert Freeman Wexler (born 1961), American writer of surreal fantasy
Robert Freedman (disambiguation)